The 2013 FIA European Truck Racing Championship was a motor-racing championship using highly tuned tractor units producing over 1000 bhp. It was the 29th year of the championship and Jochen Hahn won the title for the third year in a row with MAN.

Since Heinz-Werner Lenz, who between 1997 and 1999 won the Race-Trucks Class title at three consecutive years on his Mercedes-Benz 1938-S, and for the first time since the Super-Race-Truck Class was abolished prior to the opening of the 2006 season, Jochen Hahn is the first truck racer to win the title hat-trick on his Castrol Team Hahn Racing MAN race truck.

In 1988, 1989 and 1990, Curt Göransson was the first one to achieve such a success by winning three Class B titles in a row on his Volvo N12 race truck.

Teams and drivers

Race drivers without fixed number, whose number is defined race by race:

Calendar and winners

Championship Overall Standings

Drivers' Championship

Each round or racing event consisted of four races. At the races 1 and 3, the points awarded according to the ranking was on a 20, 15, 12, 10, 8, 6, 4, 3, 2, 1 basis to the top 10 finishers – at the races 2 and 4 with reversed grid, the points awarded were 10, 9, 8, 7, 6, 5, 4, 3, 2, 1  (rank 1 - 10) respectively.

Source of information:
and

Team Championship

Source of data:

References

External links 

Truck Race Organization
TruckRacing.de 
Race and championship results as table sheets

European Truck Racing Championship seasons
European Truck Racing Championship
Truck Racing Championship